The 2013 European Le Mans Series season was the tenth season of the Automobile Club de l'Ouest's European Le Mans Series endurance auto racing series. It is the first season of the European Le Mans Series under the control of the ACO's Le Mans Endurance Management, replacing former organisers Peter Auto. Championships are open to four categories, two of which are for Le Mans Prototypes while the other two are grand tourers. The season contested over five races starting at the Silverstone Circuit, United Kingdom on 13 April and ended at Circuit Paul Ricard, France on 28 September.

Schedule
During the 2012 season several planned races were cancelled due to low interest from teams, leading the series to adopt several changes for the 2013 calendar. All race weekends have been shortened to two days, with practice and qualifying on Friday and the race on Saturday. Races have also been shortened from six hours to three. The European Le Mans Series will also share its weekends with several other international racing series, including the FIA World Endurance Championship, World Series by Renault, and FFSA GT Tour.

The Silverstone Circuit, United Kingdom returns to the European Le Mans Series for the first time since 2011, serving as part of a Super Endurance weekend as the ELMS race will be a precursor to the 6 Hours of Silverstone for the World Endurance Championship the following day. The Autodromo Enzo e Dino Ferrari in Imola, Italy also returns to the European Le Mans Series calendar, joined by the GT Tour series. The Red Bull Ring in Spielberg, Austria is new to the European Le Mans Series, while the Hungaroring, Hungary is another circuit with ELMS history. The season finale is at Circuit Paul Ricard, France is the only event carried over from 2012. The Circuit layout used at this event was to have the full length of the Mistral straight without the chicanes. The final three races of the season are all shared with the World Series by Renault.

Entries
The entry list for the 2013 season was released on 8 February, and included eleven LMP2 and three LMPC cars, ten LMGTE entries, and five GTC cars, bringing the full grid up to twenty-nine entrants. However, only 23 cars turned up for the opening race of the season, the 3 Hours of Silverstone.

LMP2

LMPC

LMGTE

GTC

Season results

Championship Standings

Teams Championships

LMP2 Standings

LMPC Standings

GTE Standings

GTC Standings

Drivers Championships

LMP2 Standings

LMPC Standings

GTE Standings

GTC Standings

References

External links
 

 
European Le Mans Series
Le Mans Series
European Le Mans Series seasons